Abel is a surname. Notable people with the surname include:

Arts 
 Alan Abel (1924–2018), American prankster and writer
 Alfred Abel (1879–1937), German film actor, director, and producer
 Bernhard, Arnold, and Florian Abel, two sculptors and a painter in the 16th century
 Clamor Heinrich Abel (1634–1696), German baroque composer
 Christian Ferdinand Abel (1682–1761), German baroque composer, son of former
 Carl Friedrich Abel (1723–1787), German classical composer, son of former
Clementine Abel (1826 - 1905), German writer
 David Abel (cinematographer) (1884–1973), American cinematographer
 Inga Abel (1946–2000), German actress
 Jack Abel (1927–1996), American comic book artist
 Jake Abel (born 1987), American actor
 Jessica Abel (born 1969), American comics writer
 John Abel (1578/9–1675), English master carpenter
 Josef Abel (1768–1818), Austrian painter and etcher
 Ludwig Abel (1834–1895), German violinist, composer, and conductor
 Morten Abel (born 1962), Norwegian singer
 Myriam Abel (born 1981), French singer
 Robert Abel (1937–2001), American visual effects artist
Robert H. Abel (1941–2017), American author
 Sam Abell (born 1945), American photographer
 Steve Abel (born 1970), New Zealand singer-songwriter and environmental activist
 Walter Abel (1898–1987), American actor
 Yves Abel (born 1963), Canadian conductor 
 Zak Abel (born 1995), English singer/songwriter, musician, and table tennis player

History 
 Annie Heloise Abel (1873–1947), British historian
 Caspar Abel (1676–1763), German theologian, historian and poet 
 Heinrich Friedrich Otto Abel (1824–1854), German historian
 Sigurd Abel (1837–1873), German historian

Mathematics, science and technology 
 Félix-Marie Abel (1878–1953), French archaeologist, geographer and professor 
 Frederick Abel (1827–1902), chemist who made a special study of explosives
 John Jacob Abel (1857–1938), American pharmacologist
 Kathryn Abel (born 1961), British clinical psychologist
 Niels Henrik Abel (1802–1829), Norwegian mathematician
 Othenio Abel (1875–1945), Austrian paleontologist
 Ted Abel, American neuroscientist
 Tom Abel (born 1970), German astrophysicist
 Wolfgang Abel (1905–1997), German anthropologist

Medicine 
 Clarke Abel (1780–1826), British surgeon and naturalist
 Friedrich Gottfried Abel (1714–1794), German physician and son of Caspar Abel

Politics 
 Donald Abel (born 1952), Canadian politician
 Hazel Abel (1888–1966), American politician
I. W. Abel (1908–1987), American labor leader
 John Abel (Australian politician) (1939–2019), Australian politician
 Johnny Abel (1947–1995), Canadian politician
 Karl von Abel (1788–1859), Bavarian statesman
 Leighton Abel (1900–1975), American businessman and politician
Søren Georg Abel (1772–1820), Norwegian priest and politician
Valentin Abel (born 1991), German politician

Religion 
 Caspar Abel (1676–1763), German theologian, historian and poet
 Elijah Abel (1810–1884), Elder and Seventy in the Latter Day Saint movement
 Shlomo Zalman Abel (1857–1866), Lithuanian rabbi
 Thomas Abel (c. 1490–1540), English priest

Sports 
 Anicet Abel (born 1990), Malagasy footballer
Bobby Abel (1857–1936), British cricketer
 Chris Abel (1912–1986), English footballer
Florian Abel (born 1989), German footballer
Fred Abel (1903–1980), American football player
 George Abel (1916–1996), Canadian ice hockey player
Gerry Abel (1944–2021), American ice hockey player
 Graham Abel (born 1960), English footballer
 Hans-Joachim Abel (born 1952), German footballer
 Jacob Abel (racing driver) (born 2001), American racing driver
 Jennifer Abel (born 1991), Canadian Olympic diver
 Katrine Abel (born 1990), Danish footballer
Mathias Abel (born 1981), German footballer
 Mick Abel (born 2001), American baseball player
 Sid Abel (1918–2000), Canadian hockey player and coach
 Sten Abel (1872–1942), Norwegian Olympic sailor
 Taffy Abel (1900–1964), American ice hockey player
Thomas Abel (footballer) (born 1974), Danish footballer
 Tom Abel (cricketer) (1890–1937), first class cricketer
 Torsten Abel (born 1974), German triathlete
 William Abel (1887–1934), English cricketer

Other
 Carl Abel (1837–1906), German philologist
 Elie Abel (1921–2004), Canadian-American journalist, author and academic
 Greg Abel (born 1961/62), Canadian businessman
 Iorwith Wilbur Abel (1908–1987), American labor leader
 Jacob Friedrich von Abel (1751–1829), German philosopher, teacher of Schiller
 Richard Abel (lawyer), professor of law
 Rudolf Abel, an alias of Vilyam Genrikhovich Fisher (1903–1971), Soviet spy
Tom Abel (born 1970), German cosmologist

See also 
 Abell (surname)
 Abels (surname)
 Able (surname)

References